The 1977 NCAA men's volleyball tournament was the eighth annual tournament to determine the national champion of NCAA men's college volleyball. The tournament was played at Pauley Pavilion in Los Angeles, California.

USC defeated Ohio State in the final match,  3–1 (15–7, 5–15, 15–10, 15–12), to win their first national title. Coached by Ernie Hix, the Trojans finished the season 18–1. This was the first final to feature a school not from the state of California.

USC's Celso Kalache was named Most Outstanding Player of the tournament. An All-tournament team of seven players was also named.

Qualification
Until the creation of the NCAA Men's Division III Volleyball Championship in 2012, there was only a single national championship for men's volleyball. As such, all NCAA men's volleyball programs (whether from Division I, Division II, or Division III) were eligible. A total of 4 teams were invited to contest this championship.

Tournament bracket 
Site: Pauley Pavilion, Los Angeles, California

All tournament team 
Celso Kalache, USC (Most outstanding player)
Marc Waldie, Ohio State
Dusty Dvorak, USC
Bob Yoder, USC
Aldis Berzins, Ohio State
Mike Buckingham, Ohio State
Nestor Paslawsky, Rutgers–Newark

See also 
 NCAA Men's National Collegiate Volleyball Championship

References

1977
NCAA Men's Volleyball Championship
NCAA Men's Volleyball Championship
Volleyball in California
1977 in sports in California
May 1977 sports events in the United States